The 1999 Southwest Texas State Bobcats football team was an American football team that represented Southwest Texas State University (now known as Texas State University) during the 1999 NCAA Division I-AA football season as a member of the Southland Football League. In their third year under head coach Bob DeBesse, the team compiled an overall record of 3–8 with a mark of 2–5 in conference play.

Schedule

References

Southwest Texas State
Texas State Bobcats football seasons
Southwest Texas State Bobcats football